Onofrio Palumbo (active 1650, Naples) was an Italian painter of the Baroque period.

In the church of the Santissima Trinità dei Pellegrini, Naples, he painted an altarpiece of San Gennaro protecting Naples from lightning. He also painted a contemporary portrait of Masaniello now at the museum of the Certosa di San Martino.

References

External links

Orazio and Artemisia Gentileschi, a fully digitized exhibition catalog from The Metropolitan Museum of Art Libraries, which contains material on Onofrio (see index)

Date of birth unknown
Date of death unknown
17th-century Italian painters
Italian male painters
Painters from Naples
Italian Baroque painters